Seaton Grantland (June 8, 1782 – October 18, 1864) was a United States representative from Georgia.  He was born in New Kent County, Virginia. He pursued an academic course and studied law. He was admitted to the bar and commenced practice in Milledgeville, Georgia.

Grantland was elected as a Jacksonian Democrats to the 24th United States Congress and reelected as a Democrat to the 25th Congress (March 4, 1835 – March 3, 1839). He was a presidential elector on the Whig ticket in 1840. He died at his home, "Woodville," near Milledgeville in 1864. He was buried in Memory Hill Cemetery in Milledgeville.

References

1782 births
1864 deaths
People from New Kent County, Virginia
Baldwin County, Georgia
Burials in Georgia (U.S. state)
Georgia (U.S. state) Whigs
Burials at Memory Hill Cemetery
Jacksonian members of the United States House of Representatives from Georgia (U.S. state)
Democratic Party members of the United States House of Representatives from Georgia (U.S. state)
American slave owners
19th-century American politicians